Marcus Nummius Tuscus (fl. 3rd century AD) was a Roman senator who was appointed consul in AD 258.

Biography
Nummius Tuscus was the son of Marcus Nummius Senecio Albinus who had been consul in AD 227. He in turn was appointed consul prior in AD 258, alongside Mummius Bassus. No further details of his career have survived.

Nummius Tuscus was perhaps the brother of Marcus Nummius Albinus who was consul ordinarius in AD 263, and he may have been the father of Marcus Nummius Tuscus, who was consul in AD 295. According to the notoriously unreliable Historia Augusta, on one occasion he accompanied the emperor Valerian to the city of Byzantium where they visited some public baths.

Sources
 Mennen, Inge, Power and Status in the Roman Empire, AD 193-284 (2011)

References

3rd-century Romans
Imperial Roman consuls
Year of birth unknown
Year of death unknown